Roland Černák (born 22 July 1997) is a Slovak football forward who currently plays for ŠK Slávia Lackovce.

Club career

Slavoj Trebišov
At the age of sixteen and 27 days, he made his senior debut for Slavoj Trebišov against Odeva Lipany on 18 August 2013. He netted 3 goals  in 15 matches for Trebišov before his departure to FK DAC 1904 Dunajská Streda.

DAC Dunajská Streda 
On 10 July 2014, he signed a three-year contract with DAC Dunajská Streda. He made his professional Fortuna Liga debut for FK DAC 1904 Dunajská Streda against MFK Ružomberok on 26 July 2014.

References

External links
 FC DAC 1904 Dunajská Streda profile
 
 Eurofotbal profile
 Futbalnet profile

1997 births
Living people
Sportspeople from Trebišov
Slovak footballers
Slovakia youth international footballers
Slovakia under-21 international footballers
Association football midfielders
FK Slavoj Trebišov players
FC DAC 1904 Dunajská Streda players
1. FC Tatran Prešov players
MFK Zemplín Michalovce players
FK Humenné players
Slovak Super Liga players
3. Liga (Slovakia) players
2. Liga (Slovakia) players